Vahid Kheshtan (born 11 June 1992) is an Iranian footballer who plays as a forward for Esteghlal Khuzestan.

Club career

Club career statistics

References

External links
 

1992 births
Living people
Esteghlal Khuzestan players
Khooshe Talaei players
Iranian footballers
Association football forwards